Iancu Jianu is a commune in Olt County, Oltenia, Romania, named after the 19th century Wallachian hajduk Iancu Jianu. It is composed of three villages: Dobriceni, Iancu Jianu and Preotești.

Natives
Sabin Bălașa
Florin Popescu

References

   

Communes in Olt County
Localities in Oltenia